DEFINITION 6 is a digital marketing agency that was founded in Atlanta in 1997.

About 
DEFINITION 6 is headquartered in Atlanta and has offices in New York City and London. The agency is backed by Navigation Capital Partners, an Atlanta-based private equity firm. In August 2009, DEFINITION 6 acquired Creative Bubble, a video and post-production and sound engineering company based in New York. In December 2009, DEFINITION 6 acquired Leach Communications, a strategic communications firm based in New York. In September 2012, DEFINITION 6 acquired Synaptic Digital, an earned media and strategic content distributions company. Barry Sikes took over as CEO of DEFINITION 6 from Michael Kogon in 2013. Shortly thereafter former President and COO Jeffrey Katz became COO in 2014. Definition 6 has worked for various global brands.  In 2019, they became part of the Dawn portfolio of independent creative agencies.

Awards
CLIO Gold Interactive Award (CLIO Awards May 2010)
Advertising Age Small Agency Campaign of the Year for Coca-Cola's "Happiness Machine" (July 2010)

Former leadership
Jonathan Accarrino (2010-2013) - On June 24, 2010, DEFINITION 6 hired Jonathan Accarrino from NBC Universal, where he was responsible for all social networking promotion, training, and account voice development for on-air and online talent, franchises, and NBC Universal executives.
Alfred Leach (2009-2012) - DEFINITION 6 acquired PR firm Leach Communications in December 2009.

References 

Marketing companies of the United States